Thomas Greig Smith (born 20 March 1908) was a Scottish amateur footballer who made over 140 appearances in the Scottish League for Queen's Park as a goalkeeper. He represented Scotland at amateur level and was selected once for the Scottish League XI in September 1933.

Personal life 
Smith attended Shawlands Academy.

References

Scottish Football League players
Queen's Park F.C. players
Place of death missing
Date of death missing
1908 births
Association football goalkeepers
Sportspeople from East Renfrewshire
Scotland amateur international footballers
Scottish Football League representative players
St Bernard's F.C. players
Ayr United F.C. players
People educated at Shawlands Academy
Scottish footballers